Roberto Alviž  (born 6 September 1984) is a Croatian retired football player, who last played for Austrian lower league side ASKÖ Oberdorf.

Club career 
Alviž  previously played for Khazar Lankaran in Azerbaijan Premier League and Anagennisi Dherynia in Cyprus First Division. In the season 2008/2009 Flamurtari finished sixth in Albanian Superliga and won the Albanian Cup. Roberto Alviž played an important role for Flamurtari in this season, so Flamurtari offered him another 1-year contract, which he signed in the first days of June 2009.
Alviž left Flamurtari before Christmas 2009 and signed a contract for amateur club SC KNAUF Liezen in the Austrian Landesliga.

In the winter transfer window of the 2011–12 season, Alviž joined Azerbaijan Premier League side Khazar Lankaran.

In July 2013 Alviž signed for FC Atyrau in Kazakhstan. His debut came on 7 July 2013 in a 1-0 away defeat to Irtysh Pavlodar.

On 25 November 2013, Alviž went on a two-week trial with S.League side Brunei DPMM. Following the completion of the trial Brunei DPMM announced they would be signing Alviž along with Joe Gamble and Boris Raspudić.

In January 2015, Alviž signed with Persebaya. However, he was released after just 3 weeks with the team.

Following his release, he signed for Tampines Rovers on a six-months contract in February 2015 as an injury replacement for Srecko Mitrovic. Upon his signing, Tampines Head Coach, V Sundramoorthy expressed his faith in Alviž , claiming that "Alviž is a good player, and between Mitrovic and him, there’s no difference. In fact, Alviz can be as good as or even better than Mitrovic. I believe we’ve got a good player here."

He joined Austrian lower league side ASKÖ Oberdorf in February 2018, only to leave the country again in April 2019.

Career statistics

Honours
DPMM FC
Singapore League Cup (1): 2014

References

External links
 futebol365 
 soccerterminal
 
 

1984 births
Living people
People from Šibenik-Knin County
Association football midfielders
Croatian footballers
NK Međimurje players
Flamurtari Vlorë players
KS Kastrioti players
Anagennisi Deryneia FC players
Khazar Lankaran FK players
FC Atyrau players
DPMM FC players
Tampines Rovers FC players
HNK Šibenik players
Croatian Football League players
Kategoria Superiore players
Austrian Landesliga players
Cypriot First Division players
Azerbaijan Premier League players
Kazakhstan Premier League players
Singapore Premier League players
First Football League (Croatia) players
Croatian expatriate footballers
Expatriate footballers in Albania
Croatian expatriate sportspeople in Albania
Expatriate footballers in Austria
Croatian expatriate sportspeople in Austria
Expatriate footballers in Cyprus
Croatian expatriate sportspeople in Cyprus
Expatriate footballers in Azerbaijan
Croatian expatriate sportspeople in Azerbaijan
Expatriate footballers in Kazakhstan
Croatian expatriate sportspeople in Kazakhstan
Expatriate footballers in Brunei
Expatriate footballers in Singapore
Croatian expatriate sportspeople in Singapore